Walter Sachs may refer to:

 Walter E. Sachs (1884–1980), American banker and financier
 Walter Sachs (ice hockey) (1891–?), German ice hockey player